The Fries Miners' Cabins are a group of six small houses located on the 500 block of Kennedy Street, in the Starr Hill neighborhood adjacent to downtown Juneau, Alaska.  The six were built as essentially identical structures in 1913 to house miners working in the local gold mines.  The houses are -story structures of wood-frame construction, and are in the Craftsman style popular at the time.  Of the more than 200 miner houses built during Juneau's gold boom, these are among the few that survive.

The six buildings were included in the Fries Miners' Cabins historical district, also known as Kennedy Street Mine Workers Houses and Kennedy Street Historical District, on the National Register of Historic Places in 1988.

See also
 National Register of Historic Places listings in Juneau, Alaska

References

1913 establishments in Alaska
Houses completed in 1913
Bungalow architecture in Alaska
Gold mining in Alaska
Historic districts on the National Register of Historic Places in Alaska
Houses in Juneau, Alaska
Houses on the National Register of Historic Places in Alaska
Buildings and structures on the National Register of Historic Places in Juneau, Alaska